Armin Eck (born 8 December 1964 in Kulmbach, Upper Franconia) is a German football coach and a former player.

Honours
 Bundesliga champion: 1988–89
 Bundesliga runner-up: 1987–88

References

External links
 

1964 births
Living people
People from Kulmbach
Sportspeople from Upper Franconia
German football managers
German footballers
Bundesliga players
2. Bundesliga players
FC Bayern Munich footballers
Hamburger SV players
Arminia Bielefeld players
KSV Hessen Kassel players
Association football midfielders
Footballers from Bavaria